Mount Gardiner is a  summit of the Sierra Nevada in Fresno County, California in the United States, situated in the eastern part of Kings Canyon National Park. Some maps label this peak as Mount Gardner.

See also
List of mountain peaks of California

References

Mountains of Fresno County, California
Mountains of Kings Canyon National Park
North American 3000 m summits